Irgendwo auf der Welt is the eleventh solo (and thirteenth overall) studio album by Nina Hagen and the Capital Dance Orchestra, released in 2006.

Track listing 
 "Irgendwo auf der Welt"
 "Deep in a Dream" (Eddie DeLange, Jimmy Van Heusen)
 "Serenade in Blue" (Mack Gordon, Harry Warren)
 "Flat Foot Floogie" (Slim Gaillard, Leroy "Slam" Stewart, Bud Green)
 "Yes, Sir"
 "An einem Tag im Frühling"
 "Halli, Hallo"
 "Summertime" (George Gershwin, DuBose Heyward)
 "Somewhere Over the Rainbow" (Harold Arlen, E.Y. Harburg)
 "But Not for Me" (George Gershwin, Ira Gershwin) 
 "And the Angels Sing"
 "Der Wind hat mir ein Lied erzählt"
 "Roter Mohn"
 "Day In - Day Out"
 "Means That You're Grand (Bei mir bist du scheen)"
 "Happiness"
 "Für mich soll's rote Rosen regnen" (Hildegard Knef)

See also
"Irgendwo auf der Welt"

2006 albums
Nina Hagen albums